The Kiss nightclub fire started between 2:00 and 2:30 a.m. (BRST) on 27 January 2013 in Santa Maria, Rio Grande do Sul, Brazil, killing 245 people and injuring at least 630 others. It is the second most-devastating fire disaster in the history of Brazil—surpassed only by the Niterói circus fire of December 1961, which killed 503 people in Niterói, and the deadliest nightclub fire since the December 2000 fire that killed 309 people in Luoyang, China. It is also the third-deadliest nightclub fire in history, behind that fire and the Cocoanut Grove fire in 1942.

Incident

The party, called "Agromerados", organized by students from six universities and technical courses at the Federal University of Santa Maria, began on Saturday, 26 January 2013 at 23:00 UTC. Two bands were scheduled to perform that night ("Pimenta e seus comparsas" and "Gurizada Fandangueira").

In the early morning hours of 27 January 2013, a fire broke out while students from the Federal University of Santa Maria (UFSM) were holding a freshers' ball. A crowd crush occurred following the fire, and a lack of exit signs and emergency exits allegedly contributed to the deaths. Most of the victims were between 18 and 30 years old.

Witnesses have said either a flare or fireworks lit by band members may have started the fire. Brazilian police stated that the fire began when the band Gurizada Fandangueira ignited a pyrotechnic device (similar to a signaling flare) while performing on stage. The flare then ignited flammable acoustic foam in the ceiling.  According to the authorities, other reasons for the high death toll include the lack of emergency exits (the only access in and out of the building was the front door) and the fact that the number of people inside exceeded the maximum capacity by hundreds.

About 90 percent of the victims succumbed to smoke inhalation, specifically cyanide, which was among the toxic chemicals produced when fire consumed the soundproofing foam on the club’s ceiling, contributing to the high number of fatalities. Many people died as they either tried to hide in bathrooms or, in panic mistook them for exits. At least 180 bodies were removed from the bathrooms. More than 150 were injured by the crush at the front door and the rapidly accumulating smoke within the nightclub. 14 injuries were attributed to severe burns caused by flames, with eight victims succumbing to their injuries in the days and weeks following the incident. More than 90 people were hospitalized.

Colonel Guido Pedroso de Melo of the Rio Grande do Sul Fire Department stated that the club's front door was locked. De Melo told CNN: "This overcrowding made it difficult for people to leave, and according to the information we have, the security guards trapped the victims inside."

The fire has the second-highest death toll for an entertainment event in Brazil; it is second only to the 1961 Niterói circus fire, which killed more than 500 people.

Investigation

Based on an investigation and the accounts of survivors, the cause of the fire was found to be an illegal firework device that ignited the acoustic foam on the ceiling.

Two co-owners of the nightclub and two members of the band were arrested and questioned by police. One of the owners of the nightclub tried to commit suicide while still being treated at the hospital; however, one of the police officers guarding his room noticed the attempt and intervened.

The state fire department found that the premises did not have enough emergency exits and was not authorized to use fireworks. The fire department, however, did issue a permit for the club to operate. The permit stated that the club had two emergency exits. The fact that false information was used by the club and approved by the fire department resulted in a state investigation of the authorities responsible for supervising the nightclub, including the city hall and the fire department itself. It was also reported that the fire extinguishers in the club may have been artificial or were disabled at the time.

On 30 January, the nightclub's owner deflected blame to "the whole country", as well as to architects and inspectors who were commissioned with ensuring the building's safety, according to his lawyer. By that time, the death toll was at least 235. The next day, officials inspected and closed more than 58 nightlife spots around the country as part of a crackdown on unsafe public spaces.

On 2 April, two nightclub owners and two band members were charged with manslaughter.

On 1 December 2021, eight years after the fire, trial by jury procedures against the two nightclub owners and two band members commenced.

On 10 December, 2021, the two nightclub owners were sentenced to 22 and 19 years in prison respectively and the band members were given a jail term of 18 years each. However, on 3 August, 2022, the verdict was overturned due to a flawed process of jury selection.

Reactions

Domestic
Brazilian president Dilma Rousseff stated, "I want to tell the Brazilians and the population of Santa Maria that we stand together in this sad moment," before departing early from a summit of the EU and the countries of Latin America and the Caribbean in Santiago, Chile to visit grieving relatives of the victims. Rousseff declared three days of official mourning. Santa Maria's city government established thirty days of official mourning.

Organisers postponed a ceremony on 28 January in Brasília that marked 500 days to the 2014 FIFA World Cup.

The incident resulted in the inspection of safety features of thousands of nightclubs all over the country. In São Paulo alone, 60% of the nightclubs inspected were found to be operating against safety regulations.

International

 — Argentine Health Minister, Juan Luis Manzur, arranged the delivery of skin transplants for the injured, commenting: "We will make available to our Brazilian counterparts the amount of skin we can provide, according to the existence of it in our skin bank which operates in the Garrahan Hospital."
 — on 6 February 2013 during a football friendly match between England and Brazil (2–1) at Wembley, London, players of both teams wore black armbands to commemorate the 55th anniversary of the Munich air disaster and to remember those who died in the Kiss nightclub fire.
 — President of Russia Vladimir Putin sent his profound condolences to President of Brazil Dilma Rousseff.

See also

List of nightclub fires
List of fatal crowd crushes

References

External links

2013 fires in South America
2013 disasters in Brazil
Accidental deaths in Brazil
Fire disasters involving barricaded escape routes
Fires in Brazil
Human stampedes in 2013
Nightclub fires started by pyrotechnics
Santa Maria, Rio Grande do Sul
January 2013 events in South America
Man-made disasters in Brazil